Eschweilera punctata is a species of woody plant in the family Lecythidaceae. It is found in Brazil and Colombia. It is threatened by habitat loss.

References

punctata
Flora of Brazil
Flora of Colombia
Near threatened plants
Taxonomy articles created by Polbot